Gate City FC was an American soccer club based in Greensboro, North Carolina fielding a first team along with a reserve and alumni/veteran team in other league play. Gate City FC was established in May 2013 and played one season (2014) in the National Premier Soccer League (NPSL), the fourth tier of the American Soccer Pyramid, in the Mid-Atlantic Conference in 2014. The club was owned by local businessman Justin Cox.

The team played its home games at the Armfield Athletic Center at Guilford College in Greensboro.

History 
The club was officially accepted into the National Premier Soccer League on Monday, November 4, 2013. After playing in the NPSL for a single season, Gate City FC was dropped for the 2015, and could no longer play at Guildford College, for financial reasons.

The team was the subject of some controversy in 2015 after they posted a schedule including several games against United Soccer League teams. Those teams reported never agreeing to those matches, which were later removed from the Gate City FC website.

Stadium 
 Armfield Athletic Center; Greensboro, North Carolina

See also 
 List of National Premier Soccer League teams

References

External links
Official Site
Club Facebook page
Club Twitter page

Association football clubs established in 2013
Defunct soccer clubs in North Carolina
2013 establishments in North Carolina
2014 disestablishments in North Carolina
Association football clubs disestablished in 2014
Sports in Greensboro, North Carolina